Beas Pind (sometimes Bias Pind) is a village in Adampur Mandal in Jalandhar district in the north-western Indian state of Punjab. It is the largest village in the Doaba region.

Demographics

Geography
Beas Pind is situated on the Pathankot road, one of the many communities in Adampur Mandal. Beas Pind is approximately 14 kilometres from Jalandhar-West, and 134 kilometres from the state capital, Chandigarh. Nearby villages include Jagrawan (1.8 km), Dolike Sunderpur (2.2 km), Sanghwal (2.6 km), Duhre (3.2 km), and Sikanderpur (4.1 km). Nearby towns include Adampur (6 km) and Bhogpur (12.3 km).

Notable people
 Fauja Singh, British marathon runner

References 

Villages in Jalandhar district